Hovahydrus is a genus of beetles in the family Dytiscidae, containing the following species:

 Hovahydrus minutissimus (Régimbart, 1903)
 Hovahydrus perrieri (Fairmaire, 1898)
 Hovahydrus praetextus (Guignot, 1951)
 Hovahydrus sinapi (Guignot, 1955)

References

Dytiscidae